King Gong of Zhou ( or ), personal name Ji Yihu, was the sixth king of the Chinese Zhou Dynasty. Estimated dates of his reign are 922–900 BC or 917/15–900.

Biography 
King Gong of Zhou ascended to the throne in the year 922 BC after his father King Mu of Zhou departed. Unlike some of his ancestors, he dedicated to developing economy and increasing his exchequer, instead of expanding territory or conquering others through wars.

According to one account carried by the Records of the Grand Historian, King Gong of Zhou once did initiate a war and destroyed the State of Mi. When he was touring in State of Mi, he saw three extremely beautiful women and commanded Mi's lord to find them out and send them to his own palace. But the lord of the state took the three extremely beautiful women as his own concubines, which irritated King Gong. So he invaded this state and sentenced that lord to death.

After 15 years reign, he passed the throne to his son King Yì of Zhou and departed peacefully in his own palace.

Family
Queens:
 Wang Gui, of the Gui clan

Sons:
 Crown Prince Jian (899–892 BC), ruled as King Yì of Zhou from 899–892 BC

Ancestry

See also
Family tree of ancient Chinese emperors

Sources 

900 BC deaths
Zhou dynasty kings
10th-century BC Chinese monarchs
Year of birth unknown